WIN TV may refer to:

 Win Sports, a Colombian sports television network
 WIN Television, an Australian regional television network
 WIN (TV station), the flagship station of WIN Television
 WIN TV (Trinidad and Tobago), a former television station in Trinidad and Tobago
 WinTV, a product range produced by Hauppauge Computer Works

See also
 WINK-TV
 WINP-TV